Matthew Sprange is a game designer who has worked primarily on role-playing games.

Career
Matthew Sprange met with Alex Fennell in a pub in Swindon, England in late 2000; Sprange suggested starting a game company, but Fennell instead joined a 3G (third generation) mobile communication company. Over the next few months Sprange put together the rules for a miniatures game but when he decided that it would be too expensive to produce, he instead decided to form the game company Mongoose Publishing with Fennell to publish adventures under Wizards of the Coast's d20 license. Sprange had very little experience writing adventure scenarios, and since he realized that many other companies were already doing adventures, he decided to publish sourcebooks beginning with The Slayer's Guide to Hobgoblins (2001), the first in a series of "ecology" books on races of monsters. Thanks to good sales, Sprange started working in Mongoose full-time, joining Fennell. When Sprange heard of Paradigm Concepts's announcement of "The Essential Elf" (which was eventually published as Eldest Sons: The Essential Guide to Elves in 2003), he immediately added The Quintessential Elf (2002) to Mongoose's schedule, and beat Paradigm Concepts to print and protect the company's Quintessential line. Sprange designed Mongoose's new edition of RuneQuest, which was published in 2006. After acquiring the Doctor Who license, Angus Abranson and Dominic McDowall-Thomas of Cubicle 7 needed investment by the end of 2008, and went to Sprange for help, who introduced them to the Rebellion Group that Mongoose was now part of. Sprange designed the Lone Wolf Multiplayer Game Book (2010), based on the LoneWolf gamebook systems.

References

External links
 Matthew Sprange :: Pen & Paper RPG Database archive

Living people
Place of birth missing (living people)
Role-playing game designers
Year of birth missing (living people)